Paweł Kaczorowski (born 28 September 1949) is a former Polish cyclist. He competed in the team pursuit event at the 1972 Summer Olympics.

References

External links
 

1949 births
Living people
Polish male cyclists
Olympic cyclists of Poland
Cyclists at the 1972 Summer Olympics
Sportspeople from Łódź